OAFC may refer to:

Oakengates Athletic F.C.
Oldland Abbotonians F.C.
Ormond Amateur Football Club

See also
Oldham Athletic A.F.C.
Ossett Albion A.F.C.